This is a list of player transfers involving Major League Rugby teams that occurred from the end of the 2020 season and through the 2021 season. The season saw the departure of the Colorado Raptors and the addition of the LA Giltinis. The Dallas Jackals were originally scheduled to take part, but withdrew before the start of the season, delaying their debut until 2022.

Rugby ATL

Players in
  Connor Cook from  Colorado Raptors
  Bautista Ezcurra from  Argentina Sevens
  Rowan Gouws from  Otago
  Mike Matarazzo from  Notre Dame
  Jonas Petrakopolous from  Rugby United New York
  Robbie Petzer from  Dallas Jackals
  Ryan Rees from  Life University
  John Scotti from  Arkansas State
  Lincoln Sii from  Grand Canyon University
  Jalen Tatum from  Kennesaw State
  Daemon Torres from  Life University

Players out
  Jamie Ferrante retired
  Cronan Gleeson to  San Diego Legion
  Julian Montes retired
  Harley Wheeler to  USA Sevens

Austin Gilgronis

Players in
 Bryce Campbell from  London Irish
  Robbie Coetzee from  Lions
 Sebastian de Chaves from  London Irish
  Cole Davis from  Canada Sevens
  Cam Dodson from  Grand Canyon University
  Jeff Hassler from  Seattle Seawolves
  Maclean Jones from  Warringah
 Mason Koch from  Dartmouth
  Mack Mason from  Waratahs
  Conner Mooneyham from  Dallas Jackals
  Reegan O'Gorman from  Toronto Arrows
  Christian Ostberg from  Aurillac
  Hugh Roach from  Crusaders
  Isaac Ross from  Tasman
  Paddy Ryan from  Rugby United New York
  Sidney Shoop from  404 Rugby
  Lui Sitama from  American International College
  Jake Turnbull from  Randwick

Players out
  Skyler Adams to  Dallas Jackals
  Adam Ashley-Cooper to  LA Giltinis
  Juan Echeverría to  Peñarol
  Tiaan Erasmus to  Houston SaberCats
  Potu Leavasa Jr. to  Counties Manukau
  Wilton Rebolo to  Rugby United New York
  Lino Saunitoga released
  Chris Schade released
  Rodrigo Silva to  Peñarol
  Peni Tagive to  Dallas Jackals
  Luca Tani to  LA Giltinis

Dallas Jackals

On January 19, 2021, the Dallas Jackals released a statement announcing that they had withdrawn from the 2021 season.

Players in
  Skyler Adams from  Austin Gilgronis
  Mike Brown from  Rugby United New York
  Will Burke from  Rugby United New York
  Wian Conradie from  Doncaster Knights
  Carlo de Nysschen from  Colorado Raptors
  Jo-Hanko de Villiers from  Golden Lions
  Josateki Degei from  Namosi
  Marco Fepulea'i from  Auckland
  Kepeli Fifita from  Colorado Raptors
  Chad Gough from  Colorado Raptors
  Tommy Hunkin-Clark from  American International College
  Ryan James from  Colorado Raptors
  Campbell Johnstone from  Colorado Raptors
  Chad London from  Colorado Raptors
  James Malcolm from  London Scottish
  Theo McFarland from  Manuma Samoa
  Conner Mooneyham from  Life University
  Jinho Mun from  Dallas Harlequins
  Kareem Odeh from  Life University
  Tim O'Malley from  Tasman
  Kody O'Neil from  Colorado Raptors
  Robbie Petzer from  Colorado Raptors
  Cristian Rodriguez from  Belmont Shore
  Conrado Roura from  Ceibos
  Tuidraki Samusamuvodre from  Naitasiri
  Hank Stevenson from  Torondo Nomads
  Peni Tagive from  Austin Gilgronis
  Bronson Teles from  University of Arizona
  Levi van Lanen from  UW-Whitewater
  Jonetani Vasurakuta from  Nadroga

Players out
  Skyler Adams released
  Mike Brown free agent
  Will Burke free agent
  Wian Conradie free agent
  Carlo de Nysschen to  San Diego Legion
  Jo-Hanko de Villiers to  Griquas
  Josateki Degei to  TBC
  Marco Fepulea'i to  LA Giltinis
  Kepeli Fifita to  TBC
  Chad Gough to  TBC
  Tommy Hunkin-Clark to  Seattle Seawolves
  Ryan James to  LA Giltinis
  Campbell Johnstone to  Colorado XOs
  Chad London released
  James Malcolm free agent
  Theo McFarland to  Samoa Sevens
  Conner Mooneyham to  Austin Gilgronis
  Jinho Mun to  Houston SaberCats
  Kareem Odeh free agent
  Tim O'Malley released
  Kody O'Neil to  Houston SaberCats
  Robbie Petzer to  Rugby ATL
  Cristian Rodriguez to  LA Giltinis
  Conrado Roura to  Peñarol
  Tuidraki Samusamuvodre to  TBC
  Hank Stevenson free agent
  Peni Tagive free agent
  Bronson Teles to  Houston SaberCats
  Levi van Lanen free agent
  Jonetani Vasurakuta to  TBC

Old Glory DC

Players in
  David Beach from  Mystic River
  Luke Campbell from  Toronto Arrows
  Jamie Dever from  San Diego Legion
 Callum Gibbins from  Glasgow Warriors
  Matthew Gordon from  University of Mary Washington
  James King from  Valley
  Steven Longwell from  Verona
  Harry Masters from  University of Mary Washington
  Casey Renaud from  Kutztown University
  Danny Thomas from  Belmont Shore

Players out
  Matt Hughston released
  Travis Larsen to  San Diego Legion
  Tendai Mtawarira retired
  Jake Turnbull to  Randwick

Houston SaberCats

Players in
  Paula Balekana from  Zebre
  Veramu Dikidikitali from  Naitasiri
  Tiaan Erasmus from  Austin Gilgronis
  Nik Hildebrand from  Pacific Pride
  Nikoloz Khatiashvili from  Enisei-STM
  Jérémy Lenaerts from  Seattle Seawolves
  Moa Maliepo from  Timisoara Saracens
  Jinho Mun from  Dallas Jackals
  Liam Murray from  Pacific Pride
  Kody O'Neil from  Dallas Jackals
  Robbie Povey from  Utah Warriors
  Crosby Stewart from  Pacific Pride
  Apisai Tauyavuca from  Zebre
  Bronson Teles from  Dallas Jackals

 

Players out
  Kyle Breytenbach opt-out of season
  Victor Comptat to  Olympique Marcquois
  Osea Kolinisau released
  Jérémy Lenaerts opt-out of season
  Tiaan Loots released
  Boyd Wiggins retired

LA Giltinis

Players in
  Charlie Abel from  Gordon
 Adam Ashe from  Glasgow Warriors
  Adam Ashley-Cooper from  Austin Gilgronis
  Nick Boyer from  Colorado Raptors
  Glenn Bryce from  Glasgow Warriors
  Luke Burton from  San Diego Legion
  Luke Carty from  Connacht
  Angus Cottrell from  Melbourne Rebels
  Nathan Den Hoedt from  Randwick
  Dave Dennis from  Exeter Chiefs
  Marco Fepulea'i from  Dallas Jackals
  Watson Filikitonga from  Iona College
  Pago Haini from  New England Free Jacks
  Langilangi Haupeakui from  Life West
  Harrison Goddard from  Gordon
  Ryan James from  Dallas Jackals
  Mika Kruse from  Colorado Raptors
  Vise Leasi from  Belmont Shore
  Stephen McLeish from  Lindenwood University
  Harry McNulty from  Ireland Sevens
  Sean McNulty from  New England Free Jacks
  Bill Meakes from  London Irish
  Jeffrey Peleseuma from  SFGG
  Christian Poidevin from  Randwick
  Christian Rodriguez from  Dallas Jackals
  Blake Rogers from  Colorado Raptors
  John Ryberg from  Colorado Raptors
  Mafi Seanoa from  Belmont Shore
  JP Smith from  Queensland Reds
  Ruan Smith from  Queensland Reds
  Lindsey Stevens from  New Orleans Gold
  Luca Tani from  Austin Gilgronis
  Corey Thomas from  Sunwolves
  Sione Tu’ihalamaka from  San Diego Legion
  Mahe Vailanu from  Gordon
 D. T. H. van der Merwe from  Glasgow Warriors
  Luke White from  Colorado Raptors

 

Players out
  Stephen McLeish to  New Orleans Gold

New England Free Jacks

Players in
  Harry Barlow from  Harlequins
  Harrison Boyle from  Otago
  Tom Brusati from  Saint Mary's
 Erich de Jager from  Cheetahs
  Sef Fa'agase from  Otago
 Dougie Fife from  Edinburgh
  Nick Hryekewicz from  Saint Mary's
  Pieter Jansen from  Lions
  Justin Johnson from  Life University
  Joe Johnston from  Bay of Plenty
  Spencer Krueger from  Ohio State
  Jack Miller from  University of Colorado
  Tera Mtembu from  Sharks
  Aleki Morris-Lome from  Otago
 Jack Ram from  Coventry
  Vili Toluta'u from  Seattle Seawolves
  Xandré Vos from   Southern Kings
  Matt Wirken from  Rugby United New York
  Sean Yacoubian from  Colorado Raptors

Players out
  Simon Courcoul to  Rennes
  Naulia Dawai released
  Timothée Guillimin to  New Orleans Gold
  Pago Haini to  LA Giltinis
  Brad Hemopo to  Northern Suburbs
  Ben Landry released
  Sean McNulty to  LA Giltinis
  Deion Mikesell to  Carcassonne
  Erik Thompson released

New Orleans Gold

Players in
  Cian Barry from  UCLA
  Juan Cappiello from  Mont-de-Marsan
  JP du Plessis from  San Diego Legion
  Andrew Guerra from  Notre Dame College
  Stephen McLeish from  LA Giltinis
  Brian Nault from  Central Washington University
  Pat O'Toole from  Garryowen
  Kyle Rogers from unattached
  Devin Short from  San Diego Legion
  Damian Stevens from  Olimpia Lions
  Jack Webster from  LSU

 
Players out

  Lindsey Stevens to  LA Giltinis

Rugby United New York

Players in
  Benjamín Bonasso from  Club Newman
  Conner Buckley from  Iona College
  Apenisa Cakaubalavu from  Fiji Sevens
  Nick Civetta from  Oxford University
  Andrew Ellis from  Kobelco Steelers
  Faʻasui Fuatai from  Bay of Plenty
  Dan Hollinshead from  Bay of Plenty
  Evan Mintern from  Cork Constitution
  Conor McManus from  Canterbury
  Joel Miranda from  Jockey Club
  Quinn Ngawati from  Toronto Wolfpack
  Kara Pryor from  Northland
  Wilton Rebolo from  Austin Gilgronis
  Sakaria Taulafo from  Colorado Raptors
  Samu Tawake from  Manawatu

Players out
  JP Aguirre to  Seattle Seawolves
  Mathieu Bastareaud to  Lyon
  Mike Brown to  Dallas Jackals
  Will Burke to  Dallas Jackals
  Mark O'Keeffe released
  Alex MacDonald to  404 Rugby
  Alec McDonnell released
  Jonas Petrakopolous to  Rugby ATL
  Paddy Ryan to  Austin Gilgronis
  Matt Wirken to  New England Free Jacks

San Diego Legion

Players in
  Cecil Afrika from  South Africa Sevens
  Bjorn Basson from  Griquas
  Chris Baumann
  Cam Clark from  Waratahs
  Carlo de Nysschen from  Dallas Jackals 
  Cronan Gleeson from  Rugby ATL
  Santiago González Iglesias from  Munakata Sanix Blues
  Travis Larsen from  Old Glory DC
  Lua Li from  Northland
  Patrick Madden from  Cal Poly
 Chris Robshaw from  Harlequins
  Michael Smith from  UBC Thunderbirds
  Cole Zarcone from  Central Washington University

Players out
  Luke Burton to  LA Giltinis
  Jamie Dever to  Old Glory DC
  Devereaux Ferris to  Seattle Seawolves
  JP du Plessis to  New Orleans Gold
  Paul Mullen to  Utah Warriors
  Ma'a Nonu to  Toulon
  Devin Short to  New Orleans Gold
  Mike Te'o to  Utah Warriors
  Sione Tu'ihalamaka to  LA Giltinis
 Joshua Furno to  Tarbes

Seattle Seawolves

Players in
  JP Aguirre from  Rugby United New York
  Keanu Andrade from  University of California
  Devereaux Ferris from  San Diego Legion
  Rhyno Herbst from  Lions
  Tommy Hunkin-Clark from  Dallas Jackals
  Kieran Joyce from  Birmingham Moseley
  Aaron Matthews from  Saint Mary's
  Obert Nortje from  Peñarol
  Nick Taylor from  Lindenwood University

Players out
  Jeff Hassler to  Austin Gilgronis
  Olive Kilifi to  Utah Warriors
  Jérémy Lenaerts to  Houston SaberCats
  Vili Toluta'u to  New England Free Jacks

Toronto Arrows

Players in
  Ross Braude from  Blue Bulls U21
  Gaston Cortes from  Leicester Tigers
  Juan Cruz González from  CUBA
  Jason Higgins from  Cork Constitution
  Manuel Montero from  Olímpia Lions
  Marc-Antoine Ouellet from  Pacific Pride
  Joaquín Tuculet from  Jaguares
  Siaki Vikilani from  Pacific Pride
  Adrian Wadden from  Leeds Beckett

Players out
  Richie Asiata to  Queensland Reds
  Luke Campbell to  Old Glory DC
  Riley di Nardo released
  Sam Malcolm to  Kamaishi Seawaves
  Dan Moor retired
  Reegan O'Gorman to  Austin Gilgronis
  Mike Smith released
  Josh van Horne released
  Tom van Horne released

Utah Warriors

Players in
  Matthew Dalton from  Bond University
  Derek Ellingson from  Saint Mary's
 Aston Fortuin from  Southern Kings
  Danny Giannascoli from  Loyola University Maryland
  Elijah Hayes from  Iowa Central
  Fraser Hurst from  UBC Thunderbirds
  Rodney Iona from  Gordon
  Olive Kilifi from  Seattle Seawolves
  Cliven Loubser from  Leeds Tykes
  Joseph Mano from  Utah Selects
  Paul Mullen from  San Diego Legion
  John Powers from  Iona College
  Logan Tago from  Montreal Alouettes
  Mike Te'o from  San Diego Legion

Players out
  John Cullen retired
  Ara Elkington released
  Blake Hohaia to  Northland
  Dwayne Polataivao to  Tasman
  Robbie Povey to  Houston Sabercats
  Huluholo Mo’ungaloa released
  Gannon Moore released
  Vatemo Ravouvou released
  Nolan Tuamoheloa released
  Ricky Tu’ihalangingie released
  Kalolo Tuiloma to  Northland
  Fetu'u Vainikolo released

See also
List of 2019–20 Major League Rugby transfers
List of 2020–21 Premiership Rugby transfers
List of 2020–21 RFU Championship transfers
List of 2020–21 Super Rugby transfers
List of 2020–21 Pro14 transfers
List of 2020–21 Top 14 transfers

References

Major League Rugby